Rainbow Island is a 1917 American short comedy film featuring Harold Lloyd.

Plot
While fishing in a rowboat, Harold and Snub find a message in a bottle.  The paper contains a map of Rainbow Island with an X indicating buried treasure.  When they row to the island in search of the treasure, they are quickly captured by a tribe of cannibals.

Cast

 Harold Lloyd 
 Snub Pollard 
 Bebe Daniels 
 Frank Alexander
 Carl Barbesgaard
 William Blaisdell
 Sammy Brooks
 Walter Crompton
 Billy Evans
 Billy Fay (as William Fay)
 Max Hamburger
 Oscar Larson
 Gus Leonard
 Belle Mitchell
 Fred C. Newmeyer
 Hazel Powell
 Hazel Redmond
 Gertrude Smith
 Nina Speight

See also
 Harold Lloyd filmography

References

External links

1917 films
American silent short films
1917 comedy films
1917 short films
American black-and-white films
Silent American comedy films
American comedy short films
1910s American films
1910s English-language films